Hallworthy is a hamlet in the parish of Treneglos, Cornwall, England. It is at a crossroads on the A395 road from Davidstow to Launceston. To the east is a plantation called Wilsey Down Forest. It is in the civil parish of Davidstow

References

Hamlets in Cornwall